Transience or transient may refer to:

Music
 Transient (album), a 2004 album by Gaelle
 Transience (Steven Wilson album), 2015
 Transience (Wreckless Eric album)

Science and engineering
 Transient state, when a process variable or variables have been changed and the system has not yet reached a steady state.
 Transient modelling, a way of looking at a process with the primary criterion of time, observing the pattern of changes in the subject being studied over time.
 Transient response, the response of a system to a change from an equilibrium or a steady state.
 Transient (acoustics), a high-amplitude, short-duration sound at the beginning of a waveform
 Transient (astronomy), an astronomical object or phenomenon of short duration 
 Transient (civil engineering), any pressure wave that is short lived
 Transient (computer programming), a property of any element in the system that is temporary
 Transient (oscillation), a short-lived burst of energy caused by a sudden change of state
 Transient climate simulation, a mode of running a global climate model (GCM) so that the climate of the model represents a realistic mode of possible change in the real world.

Other
 "Transience" (short story), by Arthur C. Clarke
 TRANSIENT, a US secret program to intercept Soviet satellite transmissions
 Transients, a term for some homeless people
 "Transients", title short story in the 1993 collection Transients and Other Disquieting Stories by Darrell Schweitzer

See also
 Impermanence, an essential doctrine of Buddhism
 Mono no aware, a feeling of transience in Japanese culture
 Temporality, the linear progression of past, present, and future